Cecilia (or Cæcilia) was launched in 1790, possibly at Pegu, Surat, Bombay, or Calcutta. She transferred to British registry in 1797 after sailing there under charter to the British East India Company (EIC). She made one more voyage for the EIC and was wrecked in January 1804.

Career
First EIC voyage (1796): Cecilia was under the command of Captain E. H. Palmer and at Calcutta on 18 February 1796. She was at Saugor on 5 March, St Augustine's Bay on 20 June, the Cape of Good Hope on 31 August, and St Helena on 17 September, and Crookhaven on 26 November. She arrived at Long Reach on 16 December.

Cæcilia first appears in Lloyd's Register in 1797 with Palmer, master, Lambert, owner, and Calcutta as place of build. Her trade is London—India. She was admitted to the Registry of Great Britain on 17 February 1797. 

In 1800 Cæcilias master was  Thomas, and her trade was that of London-based transport.

 arrived at Portsmouth on 26 May 1800 prior to escorting Cecilia to "a certain latitude", Cecilia would then sail on to Bengal.

The government engaged Cecilia as a transport to support General Sir David Baird's expedition to the Red Sea, which in turn had the objective of supporting General Sir Ralph Abercrombie at the battle of Alexandria.

The New Oriental Register... for 1802 gives her owner as Lambert, Ross, & Co., and her master as Captain  Thomas.

Second EIC voyage (1803): Captain  Thomas left Calcutta on 28 November 1802 and passed Saugor on 28 January 1803, bound for England. Cecilia reached St Helena on 15 April and arrived at Deptford on 9 June.

Fate
Cecilia sailed on 5 December 1803 for Bengal, under the command of Captain Carrol. On 9 January 1804 she was wrecked at Madeira in a gale, and her third and fourth officers drowned.  She dragged her anchors and became wedged between two rocks. When her main mast over on the landward side passengers and crew used it as a bridge. During the following night the sea completely destroyed her.

Notes

Citations

References
 
 
 
New Oriental Register and East India Directory for 1802 (1802). (London: Black's and Parry).

1790s ships
British ships built in India
Ships of the British East India Company
Age of Sail merchant ships
Merchant ships of the United Kingdom
Maritime incidents in 1804
Shipwrecks of Portugal